Angura Muhammadpur is a village in Beanibazar Upazila of Sylhet District, Bangladesh. The village is in the 3rd Ward of Kurarbazar Union council. This village is also known by its nickname, Maodpur. There is a large madrasa called Jamia Madania Angura Muhammadpur Madrasa, funded by local villagers and people living abroad. The village is divided by the Kushiyara River. Many villagers have emigrated to Europe, the United States and the Middle East. The population of the village is 2,134. This village has a major draw back due to the inhabitants, failure in maintaining the rivers and canals. Farming has almost disappeared and therefore there is no income. Most residents are always looking to migrate to other countries due to the lack of jobs and lack of awareness about education. The village has limited natural resources. The village market is called Farir Bazar. The village does have a cemetery, the Angura Muhammadpur Tila Bari Qoborstan. In 1973, the East Angura Muhammadpur Government Primary School was opened, currently led by Headmaster Abu Tariq Khan. The village has a sports club by the name of Angura Muhammadpur Youth Club.

References

Beanibazar Upazila